In enzymology, an aminocyclopropanecarboxylate oxidase is an enzyme that catalyzes the chemical reaction

1-aminocyclopropane-1-carboxylate + ascorbate + O2  ethylene + cyanide + dehydroascorbate + CO2 + 2 H2O

The 3 substrates of this enzyme are 1-aminocyclopropane-1-carboxylate, ascorbate, and O2, whereas its 5 products are ethylene, cyanide, dehydroascorbate, CO2, and H2O.

This enzyme belongs to the family of oxidoreductases, specifically those acting on paired donors, with O2 as oxidant and incorporation or reduction of oxygen. The oxygen incorporated need not be derived from O2 with reduced ascorbate as one donor, and incorporation of one atom of oxygen into the other donor.  The systematic name of this enzyme class is 1-aminocyclopropane-1-carboxylate oxygenase (ethylene-forming). Other names in common use include ACC oxidase, and ethylene-forming enzyme.

Structural studies

Reaction Mechanism

Mechanistic and structural studies support binding of ACC and oxygen to an iron center located in the active site of ACC oxidase. The ring-opening of bound ACC is believed to result in the elimination of ethylene together with an unstable intermediate, cyanoformate ion, which then decomposes to cyanide ion and carbon dioxide. Cyanide ion is a known deactivating agent for iron-containing enzymes, but the cyanoformate ion intermediate is believed to play a vital role to carry potentially toxic cyanide away from the active site of ACC oxidase. Cyanoformate was recently identified in condensed media as a tetraphenylphosphonium salt with a weak carbon-carbon bond.

References

 
 
 
 
 
 
 

EC 1.14.17
Enzymes of known structure